Maden District is a district of Elazığ Province of Turkey. Its seat is the town Maden. Its area is 819 km2, and its population is 9,693 (2021).

Composition
There is 1 municipality in Maden District:
Maden

There are 38 villages in Maden District:

 Ağadibek
 Akboğa
 Altıntarla
 Arslantaşı
 Bahçedere
 Cumhuriyetçi
 Çakıroğlu
 Çalkaya
 Çayırköy
 Çitliköy
 Durmuştepe
 Dutpınar
 Eğrikavak
 Gezin
 Hanevleri
 Hatunköy
 Işıktepe
 Karatop
 Kartaldere
 Kaşlıca
 Kavak
 Kayalar
 Kızıltepe
 Koçkonağı
 Kumyazı
 Küçükova
 Naldöken
 Örtülü
 Plajköy
 Polatköy
 Sağrılı
 Tekevler
 Tepecik
 Topaluşağı
 Yenibahçe
 Yeşilova
 Yıldızhan
 Yoncapınar

References

Districts of Elazığ Province